Part XVIII is a compilation of laws pertaining to the Constitution of India as a country and the union of states that it is made of.  This part of the constitution consists of Articles on Emergency Provisions.

Laws
Part XVIII of the Indian constitution envisages the following three emergencies:
General Emergency (also called national emergency)
Break-down of constitutional machinery in the states -(also called state emergency)
Financial Emergency

Articles 352
This article as enacted by the Constituent Assembly of India provides the president with powers to declare a state of emergency in the nation if he/she is satisfied that the stability and integrity of India is threatened by either external aggression or armed rebellion. This power can only be exercised on the advice of the prime minister and his council of ministers.

Article 353
This article allows the central government to override the seventh schedule of the constitution (dealing with the differentiation of subjects between the central and state government). It also allows the president to prolong the life of the Lok Sabha one year at time.

Article 354-355
Article 354 empowers the central government to make funding allocations within the centre-state financial arrangements besides those stated in Article 268–279.

Article 355 outlines the duties of the government concerning individual states ensuring that the governance of all states is according to the constitution during an emergency.

Article 356
This article allows the President, on receipt of a report from the Governor of a State or otherwise, to declare a state of Emergency if he/she is satisfied that a
situation has arisen in which the Government of the State
cannot be carried on in accordance with the provisions
of the Constitution.

Article 357-358
Provisions for State Governance and State funding by the President or Parliament and making laws to be enforced during the state of Emergency.

Article 359A
Repealed - Replaced by the Constitution (Sixty-third Amendment) Act, 1989, s. 3 (w.e.f. 6 January 1990)

Article 360
On Provisions as to financial emergency.-->

References

Further reading

Part XVIII text from wikisource

Part 18